Diane Adams, née Wolanicki  (born c. 1965) is a Canadian curler from Thunder Bay, Ontario.

In 1994, she was inducted into Canadian Curling Hall of Fame together with all of the Heather Houston 1988 and 1989 team.

Personal life
Adams grew up in Rainy River, Ontario.

Teams and events

References

External links
 
 Diane Adams – Curling Canada Stats Archive

Living people

Canadian women curlers
Curlers from Northern Ontario
World curling champions
Canadian women's curling champions
Curlers from Thunder Bay
People from Rainy River District
1960s births